The Tri-Valley Conference is a school sports league within the Michigan High School Athletic Association (MHSAA), located in the Saginaw, Bay, and Midland areas of Michigan, United States.

Member schools

Current members

St. Charles left following the 2020 year. Bay City John Glenn joined to replace them.

*Shepherd & Pinconning have announced they will be departing following the 2018-2019 school year. Both schools will join the Jack Pine Conference of northern lower Michigan. After this the TVC went through a re-alignment. The Central and East merged. Midland Bullock Creek, Carrollton, Standish-Sterling, and Millington all moved to the west, and Bay City John Glenn joined the east.

Former members

Membership timeline

Athletics History

Basketball 

*CURRENT LEADER

20-21: Saginaw Nouvel reached #1 in the AP Poll before losing in the quarterfinal.

19-20: Carrollton went as high as #4 in the AP Poll.

20-21: Covid shortened season.

20-21: Bridgeport went 10-2 in the conference and coach Kevin Marshall took the Bearcats to the state semis where they lost to Battle Creek Pennfield. Carrollton lost their lone conference game with Hemlock and went to the regional finals before losing to BP, 54-53.

21-22: TVC West champion Carrollton was upset in the district by Garber, ending the legendary career of DJ Voltz.

21-22: Freeland went to the Breslin center and lost in the state semis.

Football History 

Bold: state champion

*Ithaca has won 14 consecutive TVC West championships

^Frankenmuth has won 8 consecutive TVC East championships, and have also won 53 straight TVC matchups, last lost to Millington in '14.

References

Michigan high school sports conferences
High school sports conferences and leagues in the United States